Petr Lacina (born 27 July 1973) is a Czech judoka. He competed in the men's middleweight event at the 1996 Summer Olympics. He is currently a coach of the Czech olympic champion Lukáš Krpálek.

Achievements

References

External links

1973 births
Living people
Czech male judoka
Olympic judoka of the Czech Republic
Judoka at the 1996 Summer Olympics